James Lee Dozier (born April 10, 1931) is a retired United States Army officer. In December 1981, he was kidnapped by the Italian Red Brigades Marxist guerilla group. He was rescued by NOCS, an Italian special force, with assistance from the Intelligence Support Activity's Operation Winter Harvest, after 42 days of captivity. General Dozier was the deputy Chief of Staff at NATO's Southern European land forces headquarters at Verona, Italy. The Red Brigades, in a statement to the press, stated the reason behind kidnapping an American general was that the US and Italian governments had enjoyed excellent diplomatic relations and that Dozier was an American soldier invited to work in Italy, which justified their abduction. To date, Dozier is the only American flag officer to have been captured by a violent non-state actor.

Military career
Dozier was born in Arcadia, Florida. Dozier graduated from the United States Military Academy at West Point in 1956. He was a classmate of General Norman Schwarzkopf. He went to the Armor School at Fort Knox, Kentucky, for basic and advanced training in armored warfare. He served in the Vietnam War with the 11th Armored Cavalry Regiment from 1968–1969  where he was awarded the Silver Star medal and later served tours of duty at the Pentagon and in West Germany.

Education
Dozier graduated from the U.S. Military Academy with a Bachelor of Science degree in engineering. Later he earned a Master of Science degree in aerospace engineering from the University of Arizona. Dozier attended the Army Command and General Staff College and the Army War College.

Kidnapping

Then–Brigadier General Dozier was kidnapped from his apartment in Verona at approximately 6 pm on December 17, 1981, by four men posing as plumbers. It was later reported that as many as four additional terrorists provided support with multiple vehicles. His wife, Judy Dozier, was not kidnapped, but was held at gunpoint briefly to coerce Dozier to comply and the terrorists left her bound and chained in the laundry room of their apartment. Judy Dozier was rescued after she made noise by leaning against the washing machine and hitting it with her shoulders and knees, thereby getting the attention of a downstairs neighbor.

In Paul J. Smith's (National Security Affairs professor at the U.S. Naval War College) paper The Italian Red Brigades (1969–1984): Political Revolution and Threats to the State:

Dozier was able to temporarily remove his headphones while his guard was not watching, allowing him to identify morning and evening traffic and thus tell time. He tracked the days in his diary, with a final count of 40, 2 days off from the true duration of his captivity. Dozier was able to keep a diary by playing Solitaire and writing down fake scores on paper provided by his guards. These scores were a base-seven alpha-numeric code developed by Dozier, based on the seven piles of cards used in the card game and the number of cards in each pile.

The Red Brigades held Dozier for 42 days until January 28, 1982, when a team of NOCS (a special operations unit of the Italian police) successfully carried out his rescue from an apartment in Padua, without firing a shot, capturing the entire terrorist cell. The guard, Ugo Milani, assigned to kill Dozier in the event of a rescue attempt did not do so, and was overwhelmed by the rescuing force.

After Dozier’s return to the US Army in Vicenza, he was congratulated by telephone by President Reagan on regaining his freedom.

Aftermath
Dozier was later promoted to major general and eventually retired from active military service.

Awards and decorations

During his military career he was awarded the Army Distinguished Service Medal, Silver Star and Purple Heart (for actions during Vietnam War), Ranger Tab and Parachutist Badge.

Ribbon bar

See also
Operation Winter Harvest
Barbara Balzerani
Licio Giorgieri

References

Further reading
 Collin, Richard Oliver and Gordon L. Freedman. Winter of Fire, Dutton, 1990.

External links
 Retired general recalls 1981 terrorist kidnapping
 The Dozier Kidnapping: Confronting the Red Brigades
 "The Dozier Kidnapping: Confronting the Red Brigades" (Reprint from Air & Space Power Journal)

1931 births
1980s missing person cases
Formerly missing people
Living people
Kidnapped American people
Missing person cases in Italy
People from Fort Myers, Florida
Recipients of the Air Medal
Recipients of the Defense Superior Service Medal
Recipients of the Distinguished Service Medal (US Army)
Recipients of the Legion of Merit
Recipients of the Silver Star
Red Brigades
Terrorism in Italy
United States Army Command and General Staff College alumni
United States Army generals
United States Army personnel of the Vietnam War
United States Army War College alumni
United States Military Academy alumni